August Deusser (15 February 1870, in Cologne – 28 October 1942, in Konstanz) was a German painter and art professor, at the Kunstakademie Düsseldorf.

Life and work 
From 1892 to 1897, he studied at the Kunstakademie Düsseldorf; finishing as a master student of Peter Janssen At first, he painted genre and historical works; with subjects ranging from farmers in the field, to scenes from Shakespeare.

Under the influence of Max Liebermann and Wilhelm Trübner, he became one of the first artists associated with the Düsseldorfer Malerschule to turn to Impressionism. They received harshly negative reviews from the critics in Düsseldorf, so he withdrew to Monheim am Rhein. In 1908, he emerged to exhibit a series of horse portraits at the Alte Kunsthalle. On that occasion, he received positive reviews in the magazine, from its publisher, the writer Wilhelm Schäfer.

In 1909, together with his friend, Max Clarenbach, and others, he co-founded the Sonderbund, a union of artists devoted to French Impressionism. They held major exhibitions in Düsseldorf (1911) and Cologne (1912). In that year, he moved to Wiesbaden. The organization was dissolved in 1916, during World War I. In 1917, he was appointed a Professor at the Kunstakademie Düsseldorf. He taught and painted there until his retirement in 1932. He died at his home in Konstanz, ten years later.

Since 1972 his estate, the Deusser Foundation, has operated from Bad Zurzach in Switzerland. His home in Monheim am Rhein is now a museum.

References

Further reading 
 "Deusser, August", In: Allgemeines Lexikon der Bildenden Künstler von der Antike bis zur Gegenwart, Vol. 9: Delaulne–Dubois, E. A. Seemann, Leipzig, 1913 (Online)
 Klara Drenker-Nagels (Ed.): August Deusser, Leben und Werk. Wienand, 1995 
 Biography @ the Deusser Stiftung

External links 

 
 Complete paintings @ the Deusser Stiftung

1870 births
1942 deaths
19th-century German painters
19th-century German male artists
German Impressionist painters
Academic staff of Kunstakademie Düsseldorf
Artists from Cologne
20th-century German painters
20th-century German male artists